Simplicivalva is a genus of moths in the family Cossidae.

Species
 Simplicivalva ampliophilobia
 Simplicivalva charmion
 Simplicivalva corita
 Simplicivalva eberti
 Simplicivalva interrogationis
 Simplicivalva marmorata
 Simplicivalva morgani
 Simplicivalva philobia
 Simplicivalva poecilosema
 Simplicivalva striolata

References

Natural History Museum Lepidoptera generic names catalog

Cossulinae
Cossidae genera